He's Gone may refer to:

"He's Gone", a song by Grateful Dead on their 1972 live album Europe '72
"He's Gone", a song by Suede on their 1999 album Head Music